The Villa María and Rufino Railway (VM&RR) (native name: Ferrocarril Villa María a Rufino) was a British-owned company that, towards the end of the 19th century, built and operated a broad gauge, railway line in Argentina.

History
The VM&RR was granted a concession on 15 August 1887 to construct a 227 km line between Villa María in Córdoba Province, on the Central Argentine Railway (CAR), and Rufino in Santa Fe Province, on the Buenos Aires and Pacific Railway (BA&P). The section between Villa María and La Carlota was opened on 26 October 1890 and from La Carlota to Rufino on 23 March 1891.

The line passed through the developing grain zone, which lay between the main lines operated by the BA&P and the CAR, and became a valuable feeder for the former railway.  At that time the VM&R provided farmers situated along its route with their only direct access to the port and market of Buenos Aires.

Because of their common interests the VM&RR and the BA&P forged close links until finally, in 1900, the BA&P took over the VM&R.

See also
 Buenos Aires and Pacific Railway 
 San Martín Railway

Bibliography 
 British Railways in Argentina 1857-1914: A Case Study of Foreign Investment by Colin M. Lewis - Athlone Press (for the Institute of Latin American Studies, University of London, 1983)

Defunct railway companies of Argentina
Railway companies established in 1887
Railway companies disestablished in 1900
1887 establishments in Argentina
Rail transport in Santa Fe Province
Rail transport in Córdoba Province, Argentina